The 1989 Montana Grizzlies football team represented the University of Montana in the 1989 NCAA Division I-AA football season as a member of the Big Sky Conference. The Grizzlies were led by fourth-year head coach Don Read, played their home games at Washington–Grizzly Stadium and finished the season with a record of eleven wins and three losses (11–3, 7–1 Big Sky).

Schedule

References

Montana
Montana Grizzlies football seasons
Montana Grizzlies football